Lee Joong-seo (born 9 June 1995) is a South Korean footballer who plays for Gwangju FC.

References

1995 births
Living people
South Korean footballers
K League 1 players
Gwangju FC players
Association football forwards